The 2015 season will be the 36th season of competitive association football in Malaysia.

Promotion and relegation

Pre-season

New and withdrawn teams

New teams 
 Megah Murni F.C. (FAM League)
 AirAsia F.C. (FAM League)
 Johor Darul Ta'zim III F.C. (FAM League)
 Penjara F.C. (FAM League)
 UKM F.C. (FAM League)
 Real Mulia F.C. (FAM League)
 Felcra F.C. (FAM League)
 Young Fighters F.C. (FAM League)

Withdrawn teams 
 Cebagoo F.C. (FAM League)
 Perak YBU F.C. (FAM League)

National team

Malaysia national football team

2018 FIFA World Cup qualification – AFC second round

International Friendlies

League XI

Malaysia national under-23 football team

2015 Bangabandhu Cup

2016 AFC U-23 Championship qualification

2015 Southeast Asian Games

Friendly

League season

Super league

Premier league

FAM league

Group A

Group B

Final

Domestic Cups

Community Shield

FA Cup

Final

Malaysia Cup

Final

Malaysian clubs in Asia

Johor Darul Ta'zim F.C.

AFC Champions League

Qualifying play-off

AFC Cup

Group stage

Knock-out stage 

As a result, both Al-Qadsia and Al-Kuwait were no longer eligible to compete in the AFC Cup. The second legs of both semi-finals were cancelled, and Johor Darul Ta'zim and Istiklol advanced to the final by walkover.

Pahang FA

AFC Cup

Group stage

Knock-out stage 

The Persipura Jayapura v Pahang match was not played as scheduled as Pahang players were denied entry into Indonesia due to visa issues. The AFC announced on 10 June 2015 that as a result, Persipura Jayapura forfeited the match and was considered to have lost the match by 3–0, based on the AFC Cup 2015 Competition Regulations and the AFC Disciplinary Code.

Coaching changes

Notes

References